Finlayvale is a rural locality in the Shire of Douglas, Queensland, Australia.

Geography 
The locality is bounded by the Mossman River to the south and east.

Finlayvale Road passes through the locality from the north-east (Mossman) to the south-west (Syndicate). The predominant land use is growing sugarcane. There is a cane tramway network to transport the harvested sugarcane to the Mossman Central Mill.

History 
The locality was named after the Finlayvale sugar plantation established by pioneers Denis and Teresa O'Brien. Teresa's maiden name was Finlay.

Education 
There are no schools in Finlayvale. The nearest primary and secondary schools are Mossman State School and Mossman State High School in Mossman to the east.

References 

Shire of Douglas
Localities in Queensland